The tennis competition at the 2015 Games of the Small States of Europe took place from 2–6 June 2015 at the Tennishöll Kópavogs Tennis Hall in Reykjavik.

Medal summary

Medal table

Medalists

Men's singles

Seeds

 Benjamin Balleret (quarterfinals)
 Petros Chrysochos (quarterfinals)
 Romain Arneodo (second round)
 Ugo Nastasi (final)
 Ljubomir Celebic (semifinals)
 Laurent Recouderc (winner)
 Sergis Kyratzis (quarterfinals)
 Matthew Asciak (semifinals)

Draw

Men's doubles

Draw

Women's singles

Draw

Women's doubles

Draw

Mixed doubles

Draw

  

2015 Games of the Small States of Europe
Games of the Small States of Europe
2015 Games of the Small States of Europe
2015